61st National Board of Review Awards

Best Picture: 
 Driving Miss Daisy 
The 61st National Board of Review Awards, honoring the best in filmmaking in 1989, were announced on 13 December 1989 and given on 26 February 1990.

Top 10 films
Driving Miss Daisy
Henry V
Sex, Lies, and Videotape
The Fabulous Baker Boys
My Left Foot
Dead Poets Society
Crimes and Misdemeanors
Born on the Fourth of July
Glory
Field of Dreams

Top Foreign Films
Story of Women
Camille Claudel
La Lectrice
Chocolat
The Little Thief

Winners
Best Picture:
Driving Miss Daisy
Best Foreign Film:
Story of Women
Best Actor:
Morgan Freeman - Driving Miss Daisy
Best Actress:
Michelle Pfeiffer - The Fabulous Baker Boys
Best Supporting Actor:
Alan Alda - Crimes and Misdemeanors
Best Supporting Actress:
Mary Stuart Masterson - Immediate Family
Best Director:
Kenneth Branagh - Henry V
Best Documentary:
Roger & Me
Career Achievement Award:
Richard Widmark
Special Citations:
Robert Giroux, for six decades of distinguished efforts on behalf of film
Robert A. Harris, for the restoration of Lawrence of Arabia
Critics Andrew Sarris and Molly Haskell

External links
National Board of Review of Motion Pictures :: Awards for 1989

1989
1989 film awards
1989 in American cinema